Cyclic AMP-dependent transcription factor ATF-1 is a protein that in humans is encoded by the ATF1 gene.

This gene encodes an activating transcription factor, which belongs to the ATF subfamily and bZIP (basic-region leucine zipper) family. It influences cellular physiologic processes by regulating the expression of downstream target genes, which are related to growth, survival, and other cellular activities. This protein is phosphorylated at serine 63 in its kinase-inducible domain by serine/threonine kinases, cAMP-dependent protein kinase A, calmodulin-dependent protein kinase I/II, mitogen- and stress-activated protein kinase and cyclin-dependent kinase 3 (cdk-3). Its phosphorylation enhances its transactivation and transcriptional activities, and enhances cell transformation.

Clinical significance 

Fusion of this gene and FUS on chromosome 16 or EWSR1 on chromosome 22 induced by translocation generates chimeric proteins in angiomatoid fibrous histiocytoma and clear cell sarcoma. This gene has a pseudogene on chromosome 6.

See also
 Activating transcription factor

Interactions
ATF1 has been shown to interact with:
 BRCA1, 
 CSNK2A2, 
 CSNK2A1, and
 EWS.

References

Further reading

External links 
 
 

Transcription factors
Oncogenes